The 2014 FIA WTCC Race of China, Shanghai was the tenth round of the 2014 World Touring Car Championship season and the fifth running of the FIA WTCC Race of China. It was the second of two rounds held in China in 2014, the first having taken place at the Goldenport Park Circuit in Beijing the previous weekend. It was held on 12 October 2014 at the Shanghai International Circuit in Shanghai, China.

Race one was won by José María López for Citroën Total WTCC and race two was won by Mehdi Bennani for Proteam Racing. Victory for Bennani in race two was the first for a Moroccan driver in an FIA–sanctioned race. Citroën secured the manufacturers' title for first time while Franz Engstler wrapped–up the Yokohama Trophy.

Background
López led the drivers' championship coming into the round, sixty–six points ahead of teammate Yvan Muller. Franz Engstler held the lead of the Yokohama Trophy.

William Lok replaced Michael Soong at Campos Racing as planned, joining regular driver John Filippi.

Report

Testing and free practice
López and Muller were 1–2 in Fridays test session.

Muller was quickest in the foggy conditions of free practice one on Saturday morning, the Hondas of Gabriele Tarquini and Tiago Monteiro separated the four Citroëns in the top–six.

Ma Qing Hua led a Citroën 1–2–3 in free practice two. The session had been briefly interrupted by yellow flags for Lok's Campos SEAT which had gone off at the first corner.

Qualifying
Ma was quickest in the first part of qualifying with him and his Citroën teammates filling the first four positions. Gianni Morbidelli was the first driver to miss out on a place in Q2 while all three Lada Sport cars missed out on Q2 with James Thompson the quickest of them in 14th.

Citroën was 1–2–3–4 once again in Q2 with Muller the quickest ahead of López, Ma and Sébastien Loeb. Zengő Motorsport's Norbert Michelisz was the fifth driver to through to the Q3 superpole session. Mehdi Bennani finished tenth to take pole position on the reversed race two grid, taking the place in the final moments of qualifying from Tom Coronel who had returned to the pit lane early.

López took pole with his Q3 lap one–tenth better than that of Ma's. Muller was third with Michelisz spoiling a perfect result for Citroën ahead of fifth placed Loeb.

Race One
At the start Muller had defend his third place from Michelisz, behind them the two factory Hondas of Monteiro and Tarquini were fighting over fifth place with Tarquini edging ahead. On the back straight Monteiro was under attack from Loeb although it would be on the following lap where Loeb would move ahead of Monteiro. On lap three the right rear wheel of eighth placed Tom Chilton's car came off and he was out of the race. On lap four Loeb was chasing Michelisz for fourth place, benefiting from the extra straight line speed of the Citroën on the back straight. Loeb passed Michelisz at the end of lap six to make it four Citroëns in the first four places. Double waved yellow flags were shown at the final corner near the end of the race when Lok went off at the final corner with broken suspension which left his SEAT in the gravel on the outside of the pit straight. Robert Huff slowed with a puncture on the last lap as López led a Citroën 1–2–3–4 to secure the first World Touring Car Championship manufacturers' title for the French team. Franz Engstler finished first in the TC2 class to secure the Yokohama Trophy title.

Race Two
Bennani started on pole position and retained the lead at the start while fellow front row starter Hugo Valente dropped back behind Tarquini and Monteiro. After the first few corners Bennani was starting to break away from the rest of the field who were bunched up behind Valente. On lap two Loeb made contact with Muller at the final hairpin while attempting a pass, breaking Muller's right–rear suspension in the process and the reigning champion peeled off into the pits to retire his car. On lap five Huff stopped at the side of the circuit after turn two following contact with Gianni Morbidelli who was later given a drive–through penalty for causing the collision. On the same lap Tarquini started to slow with technical problems promoting Monteiro to second as López moved into third at the expense of Valente. On lap six Loeb went up the inside of Valente at the final hairpin but it was on the following lap that he could make that move stick. Bennani held on to claim his first outright win in the WTCC with Monteiro second and López third.

After the race Loeb was given a 30–second time penalty for the incident with Muller, dropping him from fourth to twelfth in the final classification.

Results

Qualifying

Bold denotes Pole position for second race.

Race 1

Bold denotes Fastest lap.

Race 2

Bold denotes Fastest lap.

 — Chilton started from the pit lane.
 — Loeb received a 30–second penalty after the race for his collision with Muller.

Standings after the event

Drivers' Championship standings

Yokohama Trophy standings

Manufacturers' Championship standings

 Note: Only the top five positions are included for both sets of drivers' standings.

References

External links
World Touring Car Championship official website

China, Shanghai
FIA WTCC Race of China, Shanghai
FIA WTCC Race of China, Shanghai
Sports competitions in Shanghai
Auto races in China